Francesc Fullana Ginard (born 9 October 1989) is a Spanish footballer who plays as a central midfielder for Gimnàstic de Tarragona.

Club career
Born in Montuïri, Majorca, Balearic Islands, Fullana was a RCD Mallorca youth graduate, and made his senior debut with the reserves in the 2008–09 season, in Tercera División. On 12 August 2009, he signed for Segunda División B side Sporting Mahonés CF.

Fullana continued to appear in the third division in the following campaigns, representing CD Atlético Baleares (two stints), CE Constància and UE Llagostera. On 17 July 2019, he moved to SD Ponferradina, newly promoted to Segunda División, on a one-year deal.

Fullana made his professional debut on 1 September 2019, coming on as a late substitute for Yuri de Souza in a 4–0 home routing of CD Tenerife. He left the club after his contract expired, and signed a two-year deal with third division side Gimnàstic de Tarragona on 25 September 2020.

References

External links

1989 births
Living people
Footballers from Mallorca
Spanish footballers
Association football midfielders
Segunda División players
Segunda División B players
Tercera División players
RCD Mallorca B players
CF Sporting Mahonés players
CD Atlético Baleares footballers
CE Constància players
UE Costa Brava players
SD Ponferradina players
Gimnàstic de Tarragona footballers